The list of ship commissionings in 1983 includes a chronological list of all ships commissioned in 1983.


See also 

1983